Mizhirandilum is an Indian Malayalam-language television series that aired on Zee Keralam. The series was released on 2 January 2023 and telecasted on Monday to Sunday at 8 PM. The serial was directed by A M Nazeer starring Megha Mahesh as Lakshmi  and Salmanul Faris as Sanjay in lead roles. This is the story of the love and hopes of a girl named Lakshmi of Peruvannapuram.

Synopsis
Lakshmi, an orphan, has always been ill-treated by her stepmother. She meets Sanjay, a prospective groom, but destiny deals a cruel blow to her once again

Cast
Megha Mahesh as Lakshmi a.k.a Lechu/ Ammu
 Salmanul Faris as Sanjay a.k.a Sanju 
 Son of mukundan and sridevi 
 Vaishnavi as Swathy
 Daughter of Kanchana and Prabha 
 Supporting cast 
Bindu Ramakrishnan as Balamaniyamma
 Vijayakumari Ramesh as anandavally
 Lachu's stepmother, narendran's aunt, Arjun and kunjootan's mother
 Maneesh Krishna as Arjun
 Eldest son of anandavally 
 Akash Mahesh as nanduttan
 Son of Arjun and Sreeja
Archana Renjith as Shreeja
 Arjun's wife and anandavally's daughter in law
Aswin puthiyaveetil as Narendran thampi
 Panchayat president, nephew of anandavally who wishes to marry Lechu 
Abhisree as kunjoottan
 Anandavally's second son
 Maya moushmi as Sridevi mukundan
Sanju 's mother
Maya vishwanath as kanchana
 Mukundan's sister and vaishnavi's mother who hates Sridevi
 Rahul mohan as Prabha
Kanchana's husband 
 Blessy Kurian/ Sree Padma as Kavitha
Mukundan's second sister who is unmarried as her marriage was called off
 Sunitha as vasumathi,muthassi
Mother of mukundan, Kavitha, kanchana, kaveri
Rajendran N as muthassan
Father of mukundan, Kavitha, kanchana, kaveri
 Divya yeshodharan as Kaveri
 Mukundan's youngest sister 
_ as dineshan, kaveri's husband 
Akhil chitrangathan as Raju, domestic help
 Drishya MS Nair as Lechu's friend 
Ratheesh as mukundan, died
 Yehia khader as Gautam, Kavitha's illegitimate partner

Mahasangamam episodes
Sreelakshmi as Sharada
Mersheena Neenu as Shalini
Devika Pillai as Sharika 
Prabhin as Vishnu
 Poornima Anand as Sathyabhama
 Haritha Nair as Susmitha
Saji G Nair as Raghavan Nair
 Surjith Purohit as Arjun
Krishnapriya as vasumathi
 Kishore as Drama juniors manager
 Drama Juniors contestants

References

Malayalam-language television shows
Zee Keralam original programming